Dave Chappelle: The Kennedy Center Mark Twain Prize for American Humor was a ceremony presented on October 27, 2019. The show honored comedian Dave Chappelle who was being awarded with the Mark Twain Prize for American Humor which was presented at the John F. Kennedy Center for the Performing Arts in Washington D.C. Those who helped celebrate his accomplishments included Neal Brennan, Jon Stewart, Lorne Michaels, Aziz Ansari, Sarah Silverman, Bradley Cooper, and Morgan Freeman.

The event was filmed and shown on PBS as well as the streaming service Netflix in 2020. The broadcast of the ceremony was unique, because footage of the ceremony was interspersed with footage of Chappelle performing standup in various comedy clubs. The special earned two Primetime Emmy Award nominations for Outstanding Variety Special and Outstanding Picture Editing For Variety Programming.

Summary 
In order of appearance:
Morgan Freeman
Tiffany Haddish
Aziz Ansari
John Legend
Neal Brennan
Sarah Silverman
Jon Stewart
Eddie Murphy
Bradley Cooper
Lorne Michaels
Colin Jost, Michael Che and Kenan Thompson

Musical guests 
The Duke Ellington Band
Mos Def
Yasiin Bey
Common
Erykah Badu
Q-Tip
Frederic Yonnet

Reception 
The New York Times critic praised the show writing but added "The ceremony did little to explain the breaking point in Mr. Chappelle’s career and life. In highlight reels of Mr. Chappelle’s comedy, there was often at least a decade-long gap between jokes or scenes, highlighting his older, more challenging, more thrilling skit-based humor against his more recent and uneventful stand-up comedy." USA Today gave a mixed review to the special declaring, "Chappelle’s punchlines don’t hit without controversy." Specifically pointing out his defense of Louis C.K., downplaying of the allegations against Michael Jackson, and his comments regarding the Trans community.

Release 
The program was broadcast on PBS stations on Tuesday, January 7, 2020. It was also released on Netflix later in 2020.

Awards and nominations

References 

Dave Chappelle